Hastatic order is a fundamental way of breaking double "time-reversal" symmetry. It is present in the heavy-fermion compound URu2Si2. This order was dubbed hastatic from hasta, the Latin word for "spear". Its cycle is twice as complex as magnetism.

Discovery

It was said to produce extra heat and the heat was the main mystery. After the extra heat was released, particles were arranged at this way, making the hastatic order present on that reaction.

References

Fermions
Uranium